Michendorf is a municipality in the Potsdam-Mittelmark district, in Brandenburg, Germany.

Geography
Michendorf lies in a vast wooded area about nine kilometers south of Potsdam. The civil parishes ("Ortsteile") Fresdorf, Stücken and Wildenbruch lie in the Nature-Park Nuthe-Nieplitz. In the south the town adjacent to the Great Seddiner Lake and to the west by the Lienewitzer lakes.

The municipality is composed by Michendorf itself and fivecivil parishes. Population statistics are as of December 31, 2011:
 Fresdorf (293)
 Langerwisch (1,823)
 Michendorf (4,237)
 Stücken (492)
 Wildenbruch (1,845)
 Wilhelmshorst (3,103)

Demography

History

During the Division of Germany (1945–90), Michendorf was in East Germany, although only a few kilometers from West Berlin. The Michendorf rest stop was the last stop in East Germany for travelers driving into West Berlin, and a popular spot for East and West Germans to meet up with friends and family who lived on the other side of the Berlin Wall. Despite efforts by the Michendorf historical society, the rest stop was demolished in 2008.

Notable residents
Otto Böckel (1859–1923), politician notorious for exploiting anti-Semitism as a political issue, died in Michendorf.
Karin Hübner (1936–2006), actress who grew up in Michendorf.
Gerit Kling (born 1965), actress who grew up in Michendorf.
Kurt Kreuger (1916–2006), actor, was born in Michendorf, although he grew up in Switzerland.
Bernhard Seeger (1927–1999), author, lived and worked in Michendorf.

References

See also
Michendorf–Großbeeren railway

Localities in Potsdam-Mittelmark